Angasmarca or Anqasmarka (Quechua anqas blue, marka village, "blue village") is one of eight districts of the province Santiago de Chuco in Peru.

References